Michel Auguste Croz (22 April 1830 in Le Tour, Chamonix valley – 14 July 1865, on the Matterhorn) was a French mountain guide and the first ascentionist of many mountains in the western Alps during the golden age of alpinism. He is chiefly remembered for his death on the first ascent of the Matterhorn and for his climbing partnership (as a guide) with Edward Whymper.

Career as a guide

Croz began his guiding career in 1859 when he was engaged by William Mathews for an ascent of Mont Blanc. As well as making the first ascent of some of the most significant unclimbed mountains in the Alps – the Grande Casse, Monte Viso, the Barre des Écrins and the Aiguille d'Argentière – he also made the first traverse of many previously uncrossed cols, including the col des Ecrins, the col du Sélé and the col du Glacier Blanc in the Massif des Écrins (all in 1862 with Francis Fox Tuckett, Peter Perren and Bartolomméo Peyrotte). In 1863, he climbed the Grandes Rousses with William Mathews, Thomas George Bonney and his brother Jean-Baptiste Croz, and in 1864 he made the first traverse of the brèche de la Meije and the first traverse of the col de la Pilatte (with Edward Whymper, Horace Walker, A. W. Moore and Saas-Fee guide Christian Almer). Of the latter expedition, Whymper was later to write,

Matterhorn accident

Following eight failed attempts on the Matterhorn starting from 1861, Whymper was recalled to London in the summer of 1864 and offered the services of Croz to his friend Adams-Reilly, advising him to make an attempt on the mountain (all three had been in a party that had made the first ascent of Mont Dolent that year). This never came to anything, and the next year Croz was again employed by Whymper. Together with Christian Almer and Franz Biner they made the first ascent of the Grand Cornier, and the first ascent of Pointe Whymper on the Grandes Jorasses.

On the Matterhorn, Croz and Whymper tried a route via a couloir on the south-east face but were unsuccessful. Croz then had to fulfil an engagement with Charles Hudson, during which – together with T. S. Kennedy – they made the first ascent of the Moine ridge of the Aiguille Verte, whilst Whymper attempted to join forces with the Valtournenche guide Jean-Antoine Carrel. When this proved impossible (Carrel instead leading an Italian party on an attempt on the Italian ridge of the mountain), Whymper teamed up with Lord Francis Douglas and the two Zermatt guides, Peter Taugwalder father and son. Eventually this party decided to share the attempt on their common objective of the Hörnli ridge with Croz and Hudson, who had been joined by Hudson's protégé – the young, inexperienced and badly shod Douglas Hadow.

After this party of seven successfully made the first ascent of the Matterhorn on 14 July 1865, the order on the rope during the descent was Croz going down first, followed by Hadow, then Hudson, Douglas, old Peter Taugwalder and Whymper, with young Peter Taugwalder bringing up the rear. According to Claire Engel,

The rope (an old, thin and worn line) between Douglas and old Peter Taugwalder snapped, saving the remaining three members of the party – Taugwalder father and son, and Whymper. Croz's body, together with those of Hudson and Hadow (but not Douglas), were recovered from the Matterhorn glacier. Croz was buried in the south side of Zermatt churchyard, on the other side from the graves of Hudson and Hadow. Whymper wrote: 'The inscription that is placed upon his tomb truthfully records that he was beloved by his comrades and esteemed by travellers.' Whymper subsequently 'had to see to the fund for Croz's widow and he took on, later on, much care over a suitable memorial for the man who had been, despite occasional differences, undoubtedly his favourite guide.'

First ascents

Grande Casse with William Mathews and E. Favre on 8 August 1860 
Castor with F. W. Jacomb and William Mathews on 23 August 1861 
Monte Viso with F. W. Jacomb and William Mathews on 30 August 1861 
Barre des Écrins with A. W. Moore, Horace Walker, Edward Whymper, Christian Almer the elder and Christian Almer the younger on 25 June 1864
Mont Dolent with by A. Reilly, Edward Whymper, H. Charlet and M. Payot on 9 July 1864
Aiguille d'Argentière with A. Reilly, Edward Whymper, H. Charlet  and M. Payot on 15 July 1864
Grand Cornier with Edward Whymper, Christian Almer and Franz Biner on 16 June 1865
Pointe Whymper on the Grandes Jorasses with Edward Whymper, Christian Almer and Franz Biner on 24 June 1865
Moine ridge of the Aiguille Verte (second ascent of the mountain) with Charles Hudson and T. S. Kennedy in July 1865
Matterhorn with Lord Frederick Douglas, Douglas Hadow, Charles Hudson, Edward Whymper, Peter Taugwalder father and son on 14 July 1865

Commemoration
Pointe Croz (4,110 m), a summit on the Grandes Jorasses, is named after him. It was first climbed in 1909, 'probably' by Eleonore Hasenclever, Wilhelm Klemm, Felix König and Richard Weitzenböck. The summit gives its name to the Croz Spur, a major buttress on the north face of the mountain, one of the great north faces of the Alps. This buttress was first climbed by Martin Meier and Rudolf Peters from 28–29 June 1935.

Croz is commemorated in Chamonix by the avenue Michel Croz, a busy thoroughfare that crosses the river Arve in the centre of the town. One of the oldest buildings in Chamonix, the wooden Salle Michel Croz, was burnt to the ground in a fire on 15 February 1999.

References

Alpine guides
French mountain climbers
Mountaineering deaths
1830 births
1865 deaths
Sport deaths in Switzerland